Zailín Rodríguez Pérez (born 28 January 1998) is a Cuban footballer who plays as a defender for the Cuba women's national team.

International career
Rodríguez capped for Cuba at senior level during the 2018 CONCACAF Women's Championship (and its qualification).

References

1998 births
Living people
Cuban women's footballers
Cuba women's international footballers
Women's association football defenders
21st-century Cuban women